Shazzan is an American animated television series created by Alex Toth and produced by Hanna-Barbera Productions that aired on Saturday mornings on CBS from September 9, 1967 to January 20, 1968, and continued in reruns until September 6, 1969. The series follows the adventures of two teenage siblings, Chuck and Nancy, traveling around a mystical Arabian world, mounted on Kaboobie the flying camel. During their journey they face several dangers, but they are aided by Shazzan, a genie with magical powers. 18 half-hour episodes were produced, made up of two 11-minute segments.

Plot
Siblings Chuck (voiced by Jerry Dexter) and Nancy (voiced by Janet Waldo) come across a cave off the coast of Maine where they find a mysterious chest containing halves of a strange ring. When they first join the rings, they end up transported back to the fabled land of the Arabian Nights where they meet their genie Shazzan (voiced by Barney Phillips). Shazzan creates a magical flying camel named Kaboobie (voiced by Don Messick) to serve as their mode of transportation and gives them gifts like an invisibility cloak and a magic rope. Shazzan tells Chuck and Nancy that he can't return them home until they deliver the two rings to his rightful owner known as the Wizard of the 7th Mountain.

Shazzan is very large, being able to hold Chuck, Nancy, and Kaboobie in the open palm of his hand. He is wise and jolly in nature, usually appearing with a cheerful "Ho-ho ho-HO!" and addressing the two children as his "little masters". Chuck and Nancy each wear one half of the broken ring, which has to be joined to bring forth their magical servant in times of danger or different villains.

Out of the one-shot villains, Shazzan, Chuck, Nancy, and Kaboobie had two villains they encounter more than once:

 Master of Thieves - A powerful sorcerer who leads a group of thieves.
 Demon in the Bottle - An evil demon imprisoned in a bottle that seeks vengeance on those who imprisoned him.

A frequent plot device is that the two teenagers became separated, most often by the act of a villain. They cannot summon the omnipotent genie until they manage to find each other. Once Shazzan materializes, it is extremely bad news for the villain.

Style
The series is similar in its style and production details to the other Alex Toth-created CBS Saturday morning cartoons of 1966–1968, relying heavily on music and sound effects earlier created for Jonny Quest. As is typical for both animated and live-action TV series of the era that revolve around an ongoing dilemma (Dino Boy in the Lost Valley, Moby Dick and Mighty Mightor, Lost In Space, Gilligan's Island, Lidsville, etc.), the heroes never resolve their long-term situation. Chuck and Nancy never find the ring's owner and thus never return to their American teenage lives.

Voice cast
The cast included:

 Barney Phillips as Shazzan
 Jerry Dexter as Chuck
 Janet Waldo as Nancy
 Don Messick as Kaboobie

List of episodes
Each half-hour episode consists of two 11-minute cartoons.

Other appearances
Shazzan has appeared on an episode of Harvey Birdman, Attorney at Law voiced by Maurice LaMarche. In the episode "Mufti Trouble," he had a long-standing rivalry with Mentok the Mindtaker. Chuck and Nancy also appeared in the episode.

Shazzan appeared in "The Final Encounter", an episode of Space Ghost.  It was last episode of the six part "The Council of Doom". Space Ghost falls in a trap that transports him to the dimension of Shazzan. Shazzan helps him defeat the Sultan of Flame and transports him back to his own dimension.

A satirized version of Shazzan named Shazzang! appeared as an animated short as part of Robert Smigel's "TV Funhouse" feature on the late night sketch comedy series Saturday Night Live, on the May 14, 2005 episode. The parody depicted the genie Shazzang quickly defeating the villain, but then maiming and executing the villain in an increasingly sadistic fashion, to the horror of Chuck, Nancy, and Kaboobie, eventually babbling about having to "please his dad". It is shown on the DVD version of the SNL special "The Best of TV Funhouse".

Shazzan appears in Jellystone! voiced by Fajer Al-Kaisi. This version is shown to be at normal size and is a love interest for Mildew Wolf. Shazzan does many vendor jobs and is often working as a ticket seller at the Jellystone Theatre. He mentions Kaboobie in the season 2 episode "Lady Danjjer: Is It Wrong to Long for Kabong?" where he gives a shoutout to him at the time when Shazzan was promoting his gourmet ice cream.

Home media
Two episodes of Shazzan were released on a Saturday morning cartoon compilation, along with a short video containing some background information. On April 3, 2012, Warner Archive released Shazzan: The Complete Series on DVD in region 1 as part of their Hanna–Barbera Classics Collection. This is a Manufacture-on-Demand (MOD) release, available exclusively through Warner's online store and Amazon.com.  All episodes, while not perfect, have been remastered for this release.

See also
 List of works produced by Hanna-Barbera Productions
 List of Hanna-Barbera characters

References

External links

CBS original programming
1967 American television series debuts
1968 American television series endings
1960s American animated television series
English-language television shows
Genies in television
Television series by Hanna-Barbera
Hanna-Barbera superheroes
American children's animated action television series
American children's animated adventure television series
American children's animated science fantasy television series
American children's animated superhero television series
Animated television series about siblings